Malá Skála is a municipality and village in Jablonec nad Nisou District in the Liberec Region of the Czech Republic. It has about 1,200 inhabitants.

Administrative parts
Villages of Bobov, Křížky, Labe, Mukařov, Sněhov, Vranové 1.díl, Vranové 2.díl, Záborčí and Želeč are administrative parts of the municipality.

Notable people
Alois Liška (1895–1977), army officer
Jan Novotný (1929–2005), glass artist and painter; lived and died here
Miroslav Šimek (born 1959), slalom canoeist

References

Villages in Jablonec nad Nisou District